Chiles is a settlement in Cumbal Municipality, Nariño Department in Colombia.

Climate
Chiles has a subtropical highland climate (Köppen Csb) with moderate rainfall year-round and a dry season from July to September. Although afternoon temperatures are always pleasant, mornings are typically cold.

References

Nariño Department